Saurabh Dubey is an Indian film and television character actor who is best known for his television roles of Jawaharlal Nehru in Pradhanmantri,  Apaharan, Kairi — Rishta Khatta Meetha, and The Legend of Bhagat Singh.

Filmography

 1999 Sangharsh
 2000 Hamara Dil Aapke Paas Hai (as Saurabh Dube)
 2002 The Legend of Bhagat Singh as Jawaharlal Nehru
 2003 Dum as Dayaram Shinde
 2003 Border Hindustan Ka
 2003 Tere Naam
 2004 Deewaar: Let's Bring Our Heroes (as Home Minister)
 2005 Blackmail
 2005 Sarkar
 2005 Yahaan
 2005 Apaharan (as Anil Shrivastava)
 2005 Kyon Ki
 2007 Dhan Dhana Dhan Goal
 2008 Black & White
 2009 42 km.
 2010 A Flat
 2010 Ada... A Way of Life
 2011 Monica
 2011 Kya Yahi Sach Hai
 2012 Hate Story
 2012 Riwayat
 2013 Machhli Jal Ki Rani Hai
2013 Four Two ka One
2020 Twisted 3 (web series)

Television
 1996 Yug as Muhammad Ali Jinnah
 2002 1857 Kranti as Trimbakrao Pandit,Raj Purohit
 1998 Woh as Pinto,Julie's grandpa
 2010-2012 Sasural Genda Phool as Panna's father-in-law
 2012 Kairi — Rishta Khatta Meetha
 2013 Pradhanmantri as Jawaharlal Nehru
 2014 Dariba Diaries 
 2017 Kaal Bhairav Rahasya as village's chief (Pujari ji) Gauri's father
 2022 Mai: A Mother's Rage as Raghu (Web Series on Netflix)

References

External links
 
 

Indian male film actors
Indian male television actors
Indian male voice actors
Male actors in Hindi cinema
Living people
Year of birth missing (living people)